The 1930 Washington State Cougars football team was an American football team that represented Washington State College in the Pacific Coast Conference (PCC) during the 1930 college football season. In their fifth season under head coach Babe Hollingbery, the Cougars compiled a 9–0 regular season record (6–0 in PCC), won the PCC championship, lost the Rose Bowl to Alabama, and outscored their opponents 218 to 56.

All-American linemen Mel Hein and Turk Edwards were later inducted in the Pro Football Hall of Fame and College Football Hall of Fame. Elmer Schwartz was the team captain.

Schedule

References

External links
 Official game program: USC at WSC – October 11, 1930
 Official Rose Bowl program – January 1, 1931

Washington State
Washington State Cougars football seasons
Pac-12 Conference football champion seasons
Washington State Cougars football